Terry of the Times is a 1930 Universal film serial. It was the 73rd of the 137 serials released by the studio and the 5th to include sound elements. The serial was the last of Universal's part-sound serials, mostly silent productions with occasional recorded sound sequences. In this case, the serial had pre-recorded music and sound effects but no audible dialogue. The next serial released by the studio, The Indians are Coming, was an all-sound production. Terry of the Times is considered to be a lost film.

Premise
Terry (Reed Howes) must marry before a certain date in order to inherit The New York Times.  Working against him are his uncle Macy (Sheldon Lewis) and mysterious villains The Mystic Mendicants.

Cast
 Reed Howes as Terry
 Lotus Thompson as Eileen
 Sheldon Lewis as Macy
 John Oscar as Rastus
 William T. Hayes as Patch Dugan
 Mary Grant as a Moll
 Norman Thomson as a Blind Man
 Kingsley Benedict as a Hunchback

Chapter titles
 The Mystic Mendicants
 The Fatal 30!
 Death's Highway
 Eyes of Evil
 Prowlers of the Night
 The Stolen Bride
 A Doorway of Death
 A Trail of Treachery
 Caught in the Net
 A Race for Love
Source:

See also
 List of film serials
 List of film serials by studio

References

External links

New York Times review of Terry of the Times

1930 films
American silent serial films
Transitional sound films
American black-and-white films
1930s English-language films
Lost American films
Universal Pictures film serials
Films directed by Henry MacRae
1930 drama films
1930s American films
Silent American drama films